The 1914 Army Cadets football team was an American football team that represented the United States Military Academy as an independent during the 1914 college football season. In their second season under head coach Charles Dudley Daly, the Cadets compiled a 9–0 record, shut out six of their nine opponents, and outscored all opponents by a combined total of 219 to 20 – an average of 24.3 points scored and 2.2 points allowed.  In the annual Army–Navy Game, the Cadets defeated the Midshipmen, 20 to 0. The Cadets also defeated Notre Dame 

The team was recognized as the national champion by the Helms Athletic Foundation, the Houlgate System, and the National Championship Foundation, and a co-national champion by Parke H. Davis.
 
Three Army players were recognized as first-team players on the All-America team: end Louis A. Merrilat; center John McEwan; and quarterback Vernon Prichard.  Tackle Alex Weyand was selected as a third-team All-American by Walter Camp.  Four players from the 1914 team were later inducted into the College Football Hall of Fame: McEwan; Weyand; Robert Neyland (later coach at Tennessee); and Elmer Oliphant.

Schedule

Players
 Charles Benedict, fullback
 Omar Bradley (later Chairman of the Joint Chiefs of Staff Chief of Staff of the U.S. Army)
 William Butler, left tackle
 William Coffin, fullback
 John F. Goodman, center
 Charles Herrick, left guard
 Paul A. Hodgson, left halfback
 William M. Hoge, right halfback and fullback
 James P. Kelly, right end
 John McEwan, center (College Football Hall of Fame)
 Laurence Meacham, left guard and right guard
 Louis A. Merrilat, left end and right end
 Robert Neyland, left end (College Football Hall of Fame)
 Joseph O'Hare, right guard
 Elmer Oliphant, halfback (College Football Hall of Fame)
 Vernon Prichard, quarterback
 James Van Fleet, right halfback
 Alex Weyand, right tackle (College Football Hall of Fame)

References

Army
Army Black Knights football seasons
College football national champions
College football undefeated seasons
Army Cadets football